
Gmina Wierzchowo is a rural gmina (administrative district) in Drawsko County, West Pomeranian Voivodeship, in north-western Poland.

Villages
Gmina Wierzchowo contains the villages and settlements of Będlino, Bonin, Danowice, Dębniewice, Garbowo, Knowie, Króle, Nowe Laski, Osiek Drawski, Otrzep, Radomyśl, Sośnica, Świerczyna, Wielboki, Wierzchówko, Wierzchowo, Żabin, Żabinek and Żeńsko.

Neighbouring gminas
Gmina Wierzchowo is bordered by the gminas of Czaplinek, Kalisz Pomorski, Mirosławiec, Wałcz and Złocieniec.

Sources
Polish official population figures 2006

Wierzchowo
Drawsko County